The black-breasted weaver  (Ploceus benghalensis), also known as the Bengal weaver or black-throated weaver, is a weaver resident in the northern river plains of the Indian subcontinent.  Like the other weavers, the males build an enclosed nest from reeds and mud, and visiting females select a mate at least partially based on the quality of the nest.

Distribution

Resident or local migrant, endemic to South Asia. Species is described as 'common' in at least parts of its range.

It is found throughout northern part of Indian subcontinent, with small populations in the Peninsular region.

Local Names: , .

Description
It is sparrow-sized with a length of about 15 cm.
 Appearance: The male in breeding plumage has a brilliant golden-yellow crown and a variable amount of black on the head and breast; some males have an entirely black head (apart from the yellow crown) and breast, while others have a white throat or an entirely white face with a black band separating it from the fulvous-white underparts. In the non-breeding male and female, the crown is brown like the rest of the upperpart plumage, and the black pectoral band is less developed. It has a prominent supercilium, a spot behind ear, and narrow moustachial streaks, which are pale yellow. Flocks frequent cultivation and the reedy margins of tanks and jheels (shallow lakes), or extensive tall grass areas.
 Behaviour: It is polygynous and colonial, and on the whole similar to that of the baya and streaked weavers.
 Courtship: Male constructs the nest single-handedly, with a group of females visiting it during late construction stage, jumping on the helmets, tugging and testing, presumably for strength.  If a female appears interested, the male bows low before her, presenting his golden crown to her. He flaps his wings deliberately and sings softly , like the chirp of a cricket or the subdued squeaking of an unoiled bicycle wheel. Once the female agrees and permits copulation, he quickly completes the rest of the nest, and she lays her eggs inside. He immediately commences a second nest nearby to attract other females, and occasionally a third nest, or very rarely a fourth. Nests not accepted by females may be torn down by the builder himself.

Nesting
 Season: June to September
 Nest: Similar to the streaked weaver; somewhat smaller and normally with shorter entrance tubes. Built in reed-beds in marsh, often moonj or  kans (Saccharum spontaneum), with some of the growing reeds incorporated into the dome as support.  Entrance tube is somewhat shorter than Baya weavers (up to about 25 cm).  At the 'helmet' stage of construction a quantity of wet mud or cowdung is daubed thickly along the edge, with bright coloured scarlet or orange flowers or flower petals (Lantana, Lagerstroemia) incorporated; observations suggest that this is part of the courtship rituals and exercise a direct influence on the reactions of the visiting female, both for this species and the streaked weaver.
 Colony: Singly or in scattered groups of 4 or 5; sometimes larger colonies.
 Eggs: 3 or 4, white, indistinguishable from those of the other two weavers.

Gallery

References

External links
 Black-throated Weaver -  Species text in Weaver Watch.

black-breasted weaver
Birds of Pakistan
Birds of India
Birds of Bangladesh
Birds of Northeast India
black-breasted weaver
black-breasted weaver